Llotja (plural ); in ; in ; is a Catalan term for important buildings used for commercial purpose during the Middle Ages and Early Modern Ages. 

Many were used during the Medieval Ages for fishing and livestock markets or by brokers who used to make intermediaries.

Others, the so-called Casa de Contratación de Indias, were establishments destined to the control of the commercial activity, the transit of people and expeditions between Spain and the Americas. They registered all of the merchandise that circulated between Spain and the Americas and intervened in commercial trials.

Llotges in the former Crown of Aragon 
 In Catalonia
 Llotja de Barcelona or Llotja de Mar, (1352–1397) (enclosed and renovated in 1774–1802).
 Llotja de Castelló d'Empúries (built in 1393).
 Llotja de Tortosa (1368–1373).
 La Porxada (1587) in Granollers.
 In Aragon
 Loncha de Sos del Rey Católico (built around late-Medieval Ages and Early Modern Ages).
 Loncha de Alcañiz (15th century).
 Loncha de Zaragoza (1541–1551).
 Casa Consistorial de Tarazona (1563), formerly it was a llotja, the building is since mid-17th century the Town Hall.
 In the Valencian Community
 Llotja de Valencia, also called Llotja de la Seda (1482-1598). It is a UNESCO World Heritage Site.
 Town Hall of Ares del Maestrat (1295-1318), a former llotja, now the Town Hall.
 Llotja del Cànem (17th century) in Castellón de la Plana.
In the Balearic Islands
 Llotja de Palma or Sa Llotja, (1420–1452).
Currently in France
 Loge de Perpignan (14th–16th centuries).

Lonjas in the rest of Spain 
 Las Covachas or Tiendas de las Sierpes (15th century) in Sanlúcar de Barrameda.
 Lonja de San Felipe or Las gradas de San Felipe (16th century), now demolished, was in Madrid.
 Antigua Lonja (18th century) in El Puerto de Santa María.
 Casa Lonja de Alzola (17th century) in Elgoibar.

Casa de Contratación de Indias 

The Casa de Contratación de Indias centralized all of trade of the Americas with Spain from 1503 to 1790, including all types of products. Its headquarters were:
 Seville Dockyards (building built in 13th century), was the first seat for the Casa de Contratación de Indias.
 General Archive of the Indies (building built in 1584-1598) in Seville, was the most important seat for the Casa de Contratación de Indias.
 Alcázar of Seville (building built from 9th until 18th centuries), was other seat for the Casa de Contratación de Indias.
 Casa Palacio del Marqués de Torresoto (building built in 17th-18th centuries) in Cádiz, was the last seat for the Casa de Contratación de Indias.

Commercial buildings in Spain
Medieval Spain
Medieval architecture

es:Casa de contratación